The 1925 Bury St Edmunds by-election was held when the sitting MP for Bury St Edmunds Walter Guinness was nominated as Minister of Agriculture in 1925. A by-election  was required under the electoral law of the time, which he won.

References

Bury St Edmunds by-election
Bury St Edmunds by-election
Borough of St Edmundsbury
Bury St Edmunds
Bury